In Greek mythology, Pelopia or Pelopea or Pelopeia (Ancient Greek: Πελόπεια) was a name attributed to four individuals:

 Pelopia, a Theban princess as one of the Niobids, children of King Amphion and Niobe, daughter of King Tantalus of Lydia. She was slain by Artemis.
Pelopia, daughter of Pelias, King of Iolcus by either Anaxibia or Phylomache, daughter of Amphion. She appears briefly in the Argonautica, giving her brother Acastus a mantle of double fold before he sails off with the Argonauts. She and her sisters killed their father, having been tricked by Medea into believing this was needed to rejuvenate him.
Pelopia, mother of Cycnus by Ares.
Pelopia, daughter of Thyestes by whom she mothered Aegisthus.

Notes

References 

 Apollodorus, The Library with an English Translation by Sir James George Frazer, F.B.A., F.R.S. in 2 Volumes, Cambridge, MA, Harvard University Press; London, William Heinemann Ltd. 1921. ISBN 0-674-99135-4. Online version at the Perseus Digital Library. Greek text available from the same website.
Apollonius Rhodius, Argonautica translated by Robert Cooper Seaton (1853-1915), R. C. Loeb Classical Library Volume 001. London, William Heinemann Ltd, 1912. Online version at the Topos Text Project.
 Apollonius Rhodius, Argonautica. George W. Mooney. London. Longmans, Green. 1912. Greek text available at the Perseus Digital Library.
 Fowler, R. L. (2000), Early Greek Mythography: Volume 1: Text and Introduction, Oxford University Press, 2000. . Google Books.
 Fowler, R. L. (2013), Early Greek Mythography: Volume 2: Commentary, Oxford University Press, 2013. . Google Books.
 Hyginus, Gaius Julius, Fabulae from The Myths of Hyginus translated and edited by Mary Grant. University of Kansas Publications in Humanistic Studies. Online version at the Topos Text Project.

Princesses in Greek mythology
Mortal parents of demigods in classical mythology
Women of Ares
Characters from Iolcus
Mythology of Argos

de:Pelopeia (Mykene)
fr:Pélopia fille de Thyeste
Thessalian mythology